The German School of Milan (DSM), founded in 1886, is an international institution located in Milan, Italy.

It is one of the three German schools in Italy, the other two based in Rome and Genoa, in which subjects are taught in both German and Italian.

It follows the German educational program from preschool to secondary school, finally leading to graduation with both the German  and the Italian .

History 
The German School of Milan was founded in 1886 as an educational centre for children of German businessmen living in northern Italy.
Due to the drastic historical events of the early 20th century, its address changed numerous times. 
Its current location, close to the historical centre of Milan, was set in 1957 with great acclaim for its bilingual nature.

In the seventies, the school and the Italian government established an educational curriculum which integrates subjects taught in Italian in to the existing program in order to recognize graduates from this school as students of a governmental "liceo scientifico".
This grants them access to universities in both Italy and Germany.

The main building of the school underwent reconstruction and a new building was established for the Kindergarten and other facilities. The expansion of the school was completed and inaugurated in December 2007.

Activities

Alumni 
 Luciana Giussani, creator of the Diabolik comics.
 , director of films and TV Series in Germany and Switzerland
 Andrea Superti-Furga, Professor of Pediatrics and Genetics at the University of Lausanne and head of the Division of Genetic Medicine at the Lausanne University Hospital
 Giulio Superti-Furga, Scientific Director of the Research Center for Molecular Medicine of the Austrian Academy of Sciences

See also 

 Milan
 International School of Milan
 Lycée Stendhal de Milan
 German School of Athens
Italian international schools in Germany:
 Liceo Italo Svevo
 Papst-Johannes XXIII-Schule

External links 
 Website of the school

MIL
Milan
Educational institutions established in 1886
1886 establishments in Italy
Secondary schools in Italy